Poříčí u Litomyšle is a municipality and village in Svitavy District in the Pardubice Region of the Czech Republic. It has about 500 inhabitants.

Administrative parts
Villages of Mladočov and Zrnětín are administrative parts of Poříčí u Litomyšle.

References

Villages in Svitavy District